The Warrior of Capestrano is a tall limestone statue of a Picene warrior, dated to around the 6th century BC. The statue stands at around 2.09 m. It was discovered accidentally in 1934 by a laborer ploughing the field in the Italian town of Capestrano, along with a female statue in civilian attire, called Lady of Capestrano.

Description 
The Capestrano Warrior is a piece of Italic art dating back to the 6th Century BC. At first, archaeologists and historians thought these statues depicted members of a powerful Italic family.  It is made of limestone, and it stands on a base made of lithic. Two pillars were used to laterally frame the statue. It depicts a man wearing a brassard and carrying weapons and armor. He is wearing a wide-brimmed parade helmet with a crest of feathers. Between the kardiophylax lied a long sword and a knife. It also wears a mitra, which was a short apron covering the back. It had a black plate with a broad hinged band. Anthropomorphic and zoomorphic friezes decorated the handle of the sword. This statue has other weapons such as spears, javelins with throwing loops, and axes. Most of the clothing and equipment the statue is Etruscan and Italic clothing. However, the statue is wearing a hat with a huge brim and sandals with blades instead of soles. It is possible that these added garments were designed to make the statue seem larger, and more powerful. An epigraph names the statue. It is called Nevio Pomp(uled)io. This epigraphy possibly identifies him as an Italic king. Another possibility is that this statue, and the individual it depicts was subject to a damnatio memoriae. Another inscription incised on the pillar standing to the right of the warrior reads in South Picene: "Makupri koram opsút aninis rakinevíi pomp[úne]í" ("Aninis had this statue made most excellently for Rakinewis, the Pomp[onian]"). This statue has traces of pink paint.

Archaeology 
It was discovered in 1934. This discovery led to a series of archaeological excavations in the area, resulting in other statues like The Lady of Capestrano, two lithic bases, and 33 tombs being found. The statue was found in the territory of the Vestini, but depicts a man with a Picentine helmet. Investigation subsequent to the statue's discovery revealed that the vineyard where the statue was found was situated above an Iron Age cemetery.

References

See also

6th-century BC works
1934 archaeological discoveries
Archaeology of Italy
Ancient Abruzzo
Limestone statues
Military art
Picentes
Italic art
Ancient art of Italy
Iron Age art of Europe
Province of L'Aquila